Acossus is a genus of moths belonging to the family Cossidae.

Species
Acossus centerensis (Lintner, 1877) – poplar carpenterworm moth
Acossus populi (Walker, 1856) – aspen carpenterworm moth
Acossus terebra (Denis & Schiffermüller, 1775)
Acossus undosus (Lintner, 1878)
Acossus viktor (Yakovlev, 2004)

References

Cossinae
Moth genera